Sinton is a crater in the Ismenius Lacus quadrangle on Mars.  Sinton crater lies in the northern hemisphere, south of the very large crater Lyot and west of Ismeniae Fossae. 
It was named after Harvard astronomer William M. Sinton.  The name was approved in 2007.

Description 

Sinton crater is believed to have been caused by an impact into an icefield.  This impact melted ice and produced many branched valleys.  Some of these can be seen in one of the images below.  Evidence of an icefield  is lineated valley fill (LVF) and lobate debris aprons (LDA) in the region. Some of this evidence can be seen in one of the images below.

See also
 Climate of Mars
 Geological history of Mars
 Geology of Mars
 Glacier
 Glaciers on Mars
 Impact event
 Ismenius Lacus quadrangle
 List of craters on Mars
 Ore resources on Mars
 Planetary nomenclature
 Water on Mars

References 

Impact craters on Mars
Ismenius Lacus quadrangle